Jeff Libby (born March 1, 1974, in Waterville, Maine) is an American former professional ice hockey defenseman. 

He played three seasons with the University of Maine before joining the American Hockey League.  He played professionally in the International Hockey League with the Utah Grizzlies, the American Hockey League with the Kentucky Thoroughblades and Lowell Lock Monsters, and one game in the National Hockey League with the New York Islanders on March 26, 1998, against the Pittsburgh Penguins. 

His career ended on November 7, 1998, after he lost his right eye as a result of it being cut by the skate of Toronto Maple Leafs prospect, Mark Deyell, while playing for the Lowell Lock Monsters.

Career statistics

Regular season and playoffs

See also
List of players who played only one game in the NHL

References

External links
 

1974 births
Living people
American men's ice hockey defensemen
Ice hockey people from Maine
Kentucky Thoroughblades players
Lowell Lock Monsters players
Maine Black Bears men's ice hockey players
New York Islanders players
People from Waterville, Maine
Undrafted National Hockey League players
Utah Grizzlies (IHL) players
New Hampton School alumni